Carlos Domínguez Domínguez (born 18 September 1976), commonly known as Carlitos, is a Spanish retired professional footballer who played as a forward.

Over nine seasons, he amassed La Liga totals of 192 matches and 27 goals, mainly with Mallorca (five years) and Sevilla (four).

Club career
With speed as his main asset, Carlitos was best known for his stints with Sevilla FC, in which youth system he grew, and RCD Mallorca. Born in Mairena del Aljarafe, Province of Seville, he started his professional career in the 1995–96 season with the Andalusians, then served a six-month loan spell in the Balearic Islands, being instrumental in the latter club's La Liga return in 1997 by scoring nine goals.

Carlos then returned to Sevilla for a solid campaign, after which he was definitely sold to Mallorca, appearing regularly over five years although he was used mainly as a substitute, a recurring trait in his first-division career. His best output came in 1999–2000 when he netted nine times in 29 league matches, including a brace against Sevilla in a 4–0 away win. On 3 May 2003, playing just one minute at Real Madrid, he scored in a 5–1 victory.

In the summer of 2003, Carlitos joined Sevilla for a third spell, although he would appear much less during this time. After not featuring at all in the first part of his third season, he was allowed to leave in the January transfer window, signing with Segunda División team Hércules CF. In a similar move, he retired definitely from the game the following year, after a short stint with lowly Granada CF.

Honours

Club
Mallorca
Copa del Rey: 2002–03
Supercopa de España: 1998

International
Spain U18
UEFA European Under-18 Championship: 1995

References

External links

1976 births
Living people
People from Seville (comarca)
Sportspeople from the Province of Seville
Spanish footballers
Footballers from Andalusia
Association football forwards
La Liga players
Segunda División players
Segunda División B players
Sevilla FC players
RCD Mallorca players
Hércules CF players
Granada CF footballers
Spain youth international footballers